Saint-Géry (Languedocien: Sent Juèli) is a former commune in the Lot department in south-western France. On 1 January 2017, it was merged into the new commune Saint Géry-Vers.

See also
Communes of the Lot department

References

Saintgery